Equilibrium is a 2002 American science fiction film written and directed by Kurt Wimmer, and starring Christian Bale, Emily Watson, and Taye Diggs.

The film follows John Preston (Christian Bale), an enforcement officer in a future in which feelings and artistic expression are outlawed and citizens take daily injections of powerful psychoactive drugs to suppress their emotions. After accidentally missing a dose, Preston begins to experience emotions, which makes him question his morality and moderate his actions while attempting to remain undetected by the suspicious society in which he lives. Ultimately, he aids a resistance movement using advanced martial arts, which he was taught by the regime he is helping to overthrow.

Plot
Libria, a totalitarian city-state established by survivors of World War III, blames human emotion as the cause for the war. Any activity or object that stimulates emotion is strictly forbidden. Those in violation are labelled "Sense Offenders" and sentenced to death. The population is forced to take a daily injection of "Prozium II" to suppress emotion. Libria is governed by the Tetragrammaton Council, led by "Father", who communicates propaganda through giant video screens throughout the city. At the pinnacle of law enforcement are the Grammaton Clerics, trained in the martial art of gun kata. Clerics frequently raid homes to search for and destroy illegal materials – art, literature and music – executing violators on the spot. A resistance movement, known as the "Underground", emerges to topple Father and the Tetragrammaton Council.

In 2072, John Preston is a high-ranking Cleric whose wife, Viviana, was executed as a Sense Offender, leaving him as a single father of two. Following a raid, Preston notices that his partner, Errol Partridge, saves a book of poems by W. B. Yeats instead of turning it in for incineration. He follows Partridge to the Nether – a term for regions outside the city – and finds him reading the book. After seeing Preston, Partridge says that he gladly pays the heavy price of feeling emotion; Preston executes him as Partridge slowly reaches for his gun.

Preston accidentally misses a dose of Prozium, and experiences brief episodes of emotion. He then intentionally skips further doses, hiding them behind the mirror in his bathroom. Partridge is replaced with an ambitious, career-conscious Brandt, who expresses admiration for Preston's "uncompromising" work as a Cleric. On a raid, they arrest Sense Offender Mary O'Brien. To Brandt's surprise, Preston prevents him from executing O'Brien, saying she should be kept alive for interrogation. Brandt grows suspicious of Preston's hesitation.

Preston begins to feel remorse for killing Partridge and develops an emotional relationship with O'Brien. He uncovers clues that lead to meeting Jurgen, leader of the Underground. Jurgen is planning to disrupt Prozium production to spark a populist uprising and convinces Preston that Father must be assassinated. Vice-Counsel DuPont meets with Preston to reveal that there is a traitor in the upper ranks of the Clerics. Although DuPont initially suspects it is Preston, he assigns him the task of unmasking the traitor. Relieved, Preston accepts and promises to locate the Underground's leadership.

Meanwhile, O'Brien is set to be executed, and Jurgen advises against interfering, believing that it could sabotage plans for the revolution. Unable to bear her death, Preston attempts to stop the execution and fails. He has an emotional breakdown and is arrested by Brandt, who brings him before DuPont. Preston tricks DuPont into believing that Brandt is the traitor. Following Brandt's arrest, Preston is told that his home will be searched as a formality. He rushes home to destroy the hidden vials only to discover that his son, who stopped taking Prozium after his mother died, already has.

Jurgen tells Preston to capture the leaders of the resistance to regain government trust, hoping it will get Preston close enough to assassinate Father. Preston is granted an exclusive audience with Father, only to discover that Brandt was not arrested; it was part of a ruse to expose Preston and the Underground. DuPont reveals he is Father, having secretly replaced the original Father who died, and that his cabal does not take Prozium. He taunts Preston, asking how it felt to betray the Underground. Enraged, Preston fights his way through an army of bodyguards to DuPont's office, confronting and killing Brandt in a katana battle. DuPont and Preston engage in a gun kata showdown. Preston wins as DuPont pleads for his life asking, "Is it really worth the price?" Paying homage to Partridge's last words, he responds, "I pay it gladly" and kills DuPont. He destroys the command center that broadcasts Father propaganda. The Underground destroys Prozium manufacturing plants, signaling the beginning of the revolution.

Cast

Gun kata

Angus Macfadyen's character, Vice-Counsel DuPont, describes the fictional fighting style gun kata in the film:

Through analysis of thousands of recorded gunfights, the Cleric has determined that the geometric distribution of antagonists in any gun battle is a statistically-predictable element. The gun kata treats the gun as a total weapon, each fluid position representing a maximum kill zone, inflicting maximum damage on the maximum number of opponents, while keeping the defender clear of the statistically-traditional trajectories of return fire. By the rote mastery of this art, your firing efficiency will rise by no less than 120 percent. The difference of a 63 percent increased lethal proficiency makes the master of the gun katas an adversary not to be taken lightly.

Kata (型, かた) is a Japanese word for standard forms of movements and postures in karate, jujutsu, aikido, and many other traditional martial arts. The gun kata shown in Equilibrium is a hybrid of Wimmer's own style of gun kata (invented in his backyard)

Production

 
Initially announced in 1999 under the title of Librium, the film was produced by Jan de Bont's production company, Blue Tulip Productions, with most of the budget secured in a Dutch tax incentive deal thanks to de Bont's Dutch citizenship. Emily Watson was cast in May 2000, with Christian Bale cast the following month in June of that year.

Filming began on October 19, 2000 and ended on December 10, 2000. Most of the filming used locations in Berlin, due to its unique mixture of fascist and modern architecture. According to the visual effects supervisor Tim McGovern, who worked alongside Wimmer, the fascist architecture was chosen "to make the individual feel small and insignificant so the government seems more powerful". The modern architecture of Berlin emphasizes the futuristic and stolid appearance of the city-state of Libria. Thick walls are represented by an abandoned East German military base, while the exterior of the city, where many of the surviving rebels reside, was filmed in decrepit neighborhoods of East Germany. In addition to the geographic location, a few European art directors also made substantial contributions to the production.

Equilibrium locations include:
 Olympic Stadium (Berlin), built for the 1936 Summer Olympics.
 Deutschlandhalle, also built for the 1936 Summer Olympics.
 Brandenburg Gate in Berlin.
 Berlin Tempelhof Airport, construction of which was begun before the Nazi era, but which was completed during World War II and displays characteristics of the Nazis' architectural style.
 Bundestag (Berlin U-Bahn) station, a modern subway station near the new Reichstag building along with long tunnels of the Berlin U-Bahn underground railway. At the time the film was made, the Bundestag station was unopened, but in 2009, it went into service.
 Decrepit East German neighborhoods, as well as an abandoned massive former GDR military base.
 The EUR district in Rome, Italy, built during the fascist rule of Benito Mussolini.

Although making a science fiction movie, Wimmer intentionally avoided using futuristic technology that could become obsolete, and he also decided to set his story in an indeterminate future. "I wanted to create more of an alternate reality than get caught up in the gadgetry of science fiction," he explained. "In fact, there’s no technology in Equilibrium that doesn’t already exist. It’s more like a parallel universe, the perfect setting for a parable."

Reception

Critical response
The review aggregation website Rotten Tomatoes reported that 40% of critics gave the film positive reviews and an average rating of 4.8/10, based on 90 reviews, with the site's consensus stating "Equilibrium is a reheated mishmash of other sci-fi movies." Metacritic gave the film a score of 33 out of 100, based on reviews from 22 critics, indicating "generally unfavorable reviews".

Elvis Mitchell of The New York Times dismissed Equilibrium for having heavily borrowed from Fahrenheit 451, Nineteen Eighty-Four, Brave New World, and other science fiction classics.

Roger Ebert awarded the film 3 stars out of 4, noting that "Equilibrium would be a mindless action picture, except that it has a mind. It doesn't do a lot of deep thinking, but unlike many futuristic combos of sf and f/x, it does make a statement."

Wimmer said in a Dreamwatch magazine interview that "the paying customers seemed to get it," and said the critics "didn't seem to see that the film had a different message than" Fahrenheit 451 or 1984. Responding to the critics' views, Wimmer later said, "Why would I make a movie for someone I wouldn't want to hang out with? Have you ever met a critic who you wanted to party with? I haven't."

Box office
The film had an estimated production budget of $20 million. International pre-release sales had already made a profit, so the studio reduced the film's promotion and advertising budget to avoid the risk of the film losing money; as a consequence, theatrical release was limited.

The film was shown in only 301 theaters at its widest release in the United States, earning $541,512 in its opening week, and only $1.2 million when it closed on December 26, 2002; the film earned $4.1 million internationally, for a total of $5.3 million worldwide.

See also
 List of dystopian films
 List of films featuring surveillance
 List of films set in the future

References

External links

 
 
 
 

2002 films
2002 science fiction action films
American science fiction action films
American films about revenge
Dimension Films films
American dystopian films
2000s dystopian films
Fiction about mind control
Films about atonement
Films about capital punishment
Films about censorship
Films about drugs
Films about rebellions
Films about security and surveillance
Films about totalitarianism
Films about freedom of expression
Films about widowhood
Films directed by Kurt Wimmer
Films produced by Lucas Foster
Films scored by Klaus Badelt
Films set in 2072
Films set in the 2070s
Films shot in Berlin
Films shot in Italy
Films with screenplays by Kurt Wimmer
Gun fu films
Martial arts science fiction films
American post-apocalyptic films
Transhumanism in film
Films about World War III
2000s English-language films
2000s American films